Changeless is a live album by American pianist Keith Jarrett's "Standards Trio" featuring Gary Peacock and Jack DeJohnette recorded in concert in October, 1987 at various venues and released by ECM Records in 1989. According to Jarrett biographer Wolfgang Sandner, with the album, "Jarrett had, at last, combined his free-playing techniques with his trio style."

October 1987 tour 
Changeless is a compilation of tracks recorded during the "Standards trio" October 1987 North American tour in which, according to www.keithjarrett.org, offered 14 recitals in 28 days:

 3 - Ruth Eckerd Hall, Clearwater, FL, USA
 8 - Vanderbilt University, Nashville, TN, USA
 9 - Lexington, KY, USA "Lifeline"
 11 - Convention Center, Dallas, TX, USA "Endless"
 12 - Wortham Center, Houston, TX, USA "Ecstasy"
 14 - Paramount Theater, Denver, CO, USA "Dancing"
 16 - Zellerbach Hall, UC Berkeley, Berkeley, CA, USA
 19 - Northwestern University, Chicago, IL, USA
 21 - Flynn Theater, Burlington, VT, USA
 23 - Avery Fisher Hall, Lincoln Center, New York, NY, USA
 25 - Roy Thomson Hall, Toronto, OT, Canada
 27 - Orchestra Hall, Minneapolis, MN, USA
 29 - Eastman Theater, Rochester, NY, USA
 31 - Hill Auditorium, Ann Arbor, MI, USA
 November 1 -	Ann Arbor, MI, USA

Reception

The AllMusic review by Richard S. Ginell awarded the album 4 stars and states, "This is a triumph, for Jarrett has successfully brought the organically evolving patterns of his solo concerts into the group format ... a genuine collective musical experience."  

The authors of The Penguin Guide to Jazz wrote that Changeless contains "original material which is deeply subversive (though also respectfully aware) of the whole tradition of jazz as a system of improvisation on 'the changes'... On Changeless, there are no chord progressions at all; the trio improvises each section in a single key, somewhat in the manner of an Indian raga. The results are impressive and thought-provoking, like everything Jarrett has attempted."

Track listing

 "Dancing" - 9:01 [Denver]
 "Endless" - 15:32 [Dallas]
 "Lifeline" - 11:32 [Lexington]
 "Ecstacy" - 12:59 [Houston]
All music by Keith Jarrett

Total effective playing time: 48:02 (the album contains 1:02 applause approximately)

Personnel 
 Keith Jarrett – piano
 Gary Peacock - bass
 Jack DeJohnette - drums

Production
 Manfred Eicher - producer
 Tom McKenney - recording engineer
 Jan Erik Kongshaug - remixing engineer
 Dieter Rehm - design
 Gyokusei Jikihara - painting

References 

Standards Trio albums
Gary Peacock live albums
Jack DeJohnette live albums
Keith Jarrett live albums
1989 live albums
ECM Records live albums
Albums produced by Manfred Eicher